Fitchia is a genus of assassin bugs in the family Reduviidae. There are at least two described species in Fitchia.

ITIS Taxonomic note:
Apparently a 'parahomonym' of (different kingdom, same name as) vascular plant genus Fitchia Hook. f.

Species
 Fitchia aptera Stål, 1859
 Fitchia spinosula Stål, 1872

References

Further reading

 
 
 

Reduviidae
Hemiptera of North America